Mantero is a surname.

 Manuel Mantero (born 1930), Spanish professor
 Matteo Mantero (born 1974), Italian politician
 Vera Mantero (born 1966), Portuguese dancer and choreographer

See also 

 Villa Mantero
 Montero (name)

Surnames
Surnames of Italian origin
Surnames of Portuguese origin
Surnames of Spanish origin